The John Stewart Bell Prize for Research on Fundamental Issues in Quantum Mechanics and their Applications (short form: Bell Prize) was established in 2009, funded and managed by the University of Toronto, Centre for Quantum Information & Quantum Control (CQIQC). Named after the Nobel Prize winner, John Stewart Bell, it is awarded every odd-numbered year, for significant contributions relating to the foundations of quantum mechanics and to the applications of these principles – this covers, but is not limited to, quantum information theory, quantum computation, quantum foundations, quantum cryptography and quantum control. The selection committee has included Gilles Brassard, Peter Zoller, Alain Aspect, John Preskill, and Juan Ignacio Cirac Sasturain, in addition to previous winners Sandu Popescu, Michel Devoret and Nicolas Gisin.

Awarded Prizes 
Source: 
 2009: Prof. Nicolas Gisin for his theoretical and experimental work on quantum nonlocality, quantum cryptography and quantum teleportation.
 2011: Sandu Popescu, Professor of Physics at the University of Bristol, UK, for discoveries of stronger-than-quantum no-signaling correlations, and the application of quantum theory to thermodynamics.
 2013: Michel Devoret and Robert J. Schoelkopf, Professors of Applied Physics at Yale University, USA, for their work on entangling superconducting qubits and microwave photons, and their application to quantum information processing.
 2015: Rainer Blatt, Professor of Experimental Physics at University of Innsbruck, and director of Institute for Quantum Optics and Quantum Information Innsbruck, Austria, for his works on quantum information processing with trapped ions.
 2017: Ronald Hanson (Delft University of Technology), Sae Woo Nam (National Institute of Standards and Technology), and Anton Zeilinger (University of Vienna) for "their groups’ experiments simultaneously closing the detection and locality loopholes in a violation of Bell’s Inequalities".
 2019: Juan Ignacio Cirac (Max Planck Institute of Quantum Optics) and Peter Zoller (University of Innsbruck and IQOQI) for "their recent groundbreaking proposals in quantum optics and atomic physics on how to engineer quantum systems to carry out novel information processing tasks, in particular for extending the applications of quantum simulators to lattice gauge theories, showing how long range entanglement can be estimated via statistical measurements, and using Projected Entangled Pair States for the theoretical study of quantum many body systems".
 2021: John M. Martinis (University of California, Santa Barbara). (Official ceremony: 1 June 2021)

See also
 List of physics awards

References

Physics awards
Quantum mechanics
University of Toronto